Sogasu jūḍa taramā is a popular Telugu composition of Tyagaraja Swamy in Raga kannaḍa Gauḷa.

Lyric and meaning 
The form of  consists of traditional Carnatic sections, with the meanings in the table below.

Common variations 
 pada yugamu, kara yugamu, adharamu, uramu, nagavulu, muṅgurulu, tēṭa - pada yugamō, kara yugamō, adharamō, uramō, navvō, muṅgurulō, tēṭō
  tyāgarāja vandanīya – tyāgarājārcita vandanīya

See also 
 Tyagaraja swamy
 List of Carnatic composers

References

External links 

 cUDa taramA - Thirvaiyyaru P.Sekhar

Telugu-language songs
Carnatic compositions